South Korea competed at the 2001 East Asian Games held in Osaka, Japan from May 19, 2001 to May 27, 2001. South Korea finished third with 34 gold medals, 46 silver medals, and 32 bronze medals.

Medal summary

Medal table

East Asian Games
2001 East Asian Games
South Korea at the East Asian Games